A Sport of Nature  is a 1987 novel by the South African writer Nadine Gordimer.

Plot
While still a secondary school student, Kim Capran decides to rename herself "Hillela". Hillela joins the ANC, she marries a black man from the congress and has a child with him.  She travels to Dar es Salaam and Nairobi before returning to South Africa in the final pages as the wife of a fictitious President of Kenya.

Reception
In Gordimer's Nobel Prize citation, "A Sport of Nature" was described as "[her] most hazardous undertaking."

References

1987 novels
20th-century South African novels
Apartheid novels
Novels by Nadine Gordimer
Novels set in Africa